Shilla is a mountain peak close to Spiti Valley, part of the Himalaya mountains. It is in Himachal Pradesh in Northern India. The name may be derived from: Shi = death, Shi-la = range or peak death. Other meanings locally offered are 'a place of monastery' or 'a gateway to heaven’. The Shilla peak is on the divide between Lingti and Shilla Nullah/nala.

Climbing history

Notes

References

Bibliography

 

Mountains of Himachal Pradesh
Geography of Lahaul and Spiti district
Six-thousanders of the Himalayas